Designed for children ages 4–10, Dr. Seuss' Fix-Up the Mix-Up Puzzler is an electronic sliding puzzle featuring six Dr. Seuss characters: the Cat in the Hat, the Grinch, a Star-Bellied Sneetch, the Doorman, and the Woset and Clark. The object of the game is to reassemble scrambled pictures, each of which is composed of three characters.

There are five difficulty levels from which to choose. In the easiest level, kids can mix and match the characters' heads, torsos and feet any way they like. In higher levels of play, there are more puzzle pieces, some of which are upside down, and characters must be assembled in their original left-to-right order. Puzzles range in size from 9 to 25 pieces. The fifth level has a time limit which, when beaten, will give the player bonus points.

The manual for Dr. Seuss' Fix-Up the Mix-Up Puzzler claims that the game promotes problem-solving strategies, logic, pattern recognition, memory and a variety of other early learning skills.

External links
 
 

1984 video games
ColecoVision games
ColecoVision-only games
Adaptations of works by Dr. Seuss
Children's educational video games
North America-exclusive video games
Puzzle video games
Video games developed in the United States
Single-player video games